NGC 6810 is a spiral galaxy approximately 87 million light-years away from Earth in the constellation of Pavo.

Observational history 
NGC 6810 was discovered by John Herschel on July 10, 1834. It was later added to the New General Catalogue by John Louis Emil Dreyer.

Misclassification of NGC 6810 
This galaxy used to be classified as a Seyfert 2 galaxy, but that is probably incorrect. Recent X-ray observations provide no evidence of any active galactic nucleus (AGN) activity, and high resolution optical spectra do not confirm the status of NGC 6810 as a Seyfert galaxy, thus it appears to have been misclassified.

Features
NGC 6810 is an early-type spiral of roughly equivalent mass to the Milky Way. X-ray, optical, IR and radio properties of NGC 6810 are all consistent with a starburst galaxy.

Galactic-scale superwind
Observation of NGC 6810 with XMM-Newton reveals the presence of extended soft X-ray emission within the optical disc of the galaxy (which is closely associated with star-forming regions) and also beyond the optical disc. This, along with Hα filamentation and peculiar minor axis ionized gas kinematics, strongly suggest that NGC 6810 is host to a galactic-scale superwind which is streaming from the starburst region.

The actively star-forming regions and the base radius of the outflow are unusually spread out, and extend out to a radius of ∼6.5 kpc from the nucleus. Most superwinds in other galaxies appear to arise in ≲ 1 kpc-scale nuclear starburst regions. That makes NGC 6810 one of the few ‘disc-wide’ superwinds currently known, because NGC 6810's superwind base extends across nearly 70 percent of the entire galaxy's diameter. Only three other starburst galaxies are known to have broad superwind sources.

See also 
 List of NGC objects (6001–7000)

References

External links 

 
 SEDS

Unbarred spiral galaxies
Starburst galaxies
Pavo (constellation)
6810
63571
Astronomical objects discovered in 1834
Discoveries by John Herschel